Stepan Beril is the president of T. G. Shevchenko University in Tiraspol, the capital of the partially recognised state of Transnistria. He has presided over the university with 14 faculties and 84 chairs, offering 54 different majors, since 1996.

References

Living people
Transnistrian people
Soviet physicists
20th-century physicists
1951 births